Choghabur may refer to:
Choghabur-e Kaki
Choghabur-e Rahman